The Basilica-Sanctuary of Maria Santissima Annunziata (also called "Madonna of Trapani") is a Roman Catholic church and minor basilica, dedicated to Our Lady of Mount Carmel in Trapani, in Sicily.

It is included in the Roman Catholic Diocese of Trapani.

The basilica
Was originally built by the Carmelite Order in 1315–1332 and rebuilt in 1760.

The church houses the skull of Saint Albert of Trapani in a silver statue crafted in the 18th century, and the relics of Clement of Ancyra.

Statue of the Madonna
It houses a marble statue of the Madonna of Trapani (Our Lady with Child), which might be the work of Nino Pisano.
The statue is life-size, weighs 12 tons and is 165 cm high. To her left she is holding the baby Jesus. Pope Clement XII granted a decree to crown this image in his name in the year 1734.

The museum
The ancient convent today is the "regional museum Agostino Pepoli", one of the most important Sicilian museum.

Note

See also 
Our Lady of Trapani procession (Tunis)

Minor basilicas in Sicily
Baroque church buildings in Sicily
18th-century Roman Catholic church buildings in Italy
Trapani